Susan M. Carney (born 1961) is an American attorney and jurist serving as an associate justice of the Supreme Court of Alaska. Appointed on May 12, 2016, she was sworn in on August 26, 2016.

Biography 
Born in Worcester, Massachusetts, Carney earned her bachelor's degree in history and literature at Radcliffe College and graduated cum laude from Harvard Law School.

After law school, she clerked for Alaska Supreme Court Justice Jay Rabinowitz. Carney later worked as a defense attorney in the Office of Public Advocacy and with the Alaska Public Defender Agency.

References

External links
Susan Carney at Ballotpedia
Judicial Application

1961 births
Living people
Justices of the Alaska Supreme Court
Radcliffe College alumni
Harvard Law School alumni
People from Worcester, Massachusetts
Public defenders
21st-century American judges
21st-century American women judges